Isles of Wonder is the official soundtrack album of the 2012 Summer Olympics opening ceremony. It became available as a download at midnight on 28 July 2012 and as a two-disc CD on 2 August 2012. The soundtrack is mostly pre-recorded and does not include live elements of the performance such as the drumming from Evelyn Glennie, but the two Arctic Monkeys songs are actually credited in the album sleeve as being recorded during the rehearsal at the stadium on 23 July.

Although listed as "Tubular Bells" / "In Dulci Jubilo", Mike Oldfield's track starts with the introduction piece to Tubular Bells in its normal arrangement, followed by a rearranged version of the same theme that during interviews Oldfield called "swingular bells".  The piece that was used when the children's literature villains appeared features two arrangements of "Far Above the Clouds" (from Tubular Bells III), and finally there is a rendition of "In Dulci Jubilo" followed by a short coda.

The cover of the CD is a graphic representation of the 'petals' of Thomas Heatherwick's 2012 Summer Olympics and Paralympics cauldron.

Reception and reviews
The London Evening Standard gave the album four stars, commenting "As both a souvenir of one of the great events of our era and a rip-roaring collection, it’s hard to fault."

Within two days of release the download album had topped the iTunes album charts in Britain, France, Belgium, The Netherlands and Spain, and reached no. 5 in the United States, as well as reaching no. 5 in the overall British official album charts.

Track listing

See also 

 “Survival”: the official song for the London 2012 Olympics
 A Symphony of British Music: the official soundtrack album of the London 2012 Olympics closing ceremony.

References 

2012 soundtrack albums
2012 Summer Olympics
Decca Records soundtracks
Pop compilation albums
Olympic albums